The 2001 MAAC men's basketball tournament was held March 2–5, 2001 at Marine Midland Arena in Buffalo, New York.

Top-seeded  defeated  in the championship game, 74–67, to win their sixth MAAC men's basketball tournament.

The Gaels received an automatic bid to the 2001 NCAA tournament.

Format
All ten of the conference's members participated in the tournament field. They were seeded based on regular season conference records.

Bracket

References

MAAC men's basketball tournament